Ragne Wiklund (born 9 May 2000) is a Norwegian long track speed skater and orienteer.

Wiklund represented her nation at the 2019 World Single Distance Speed Skating Championships in the 1500 metres event (19th) and at the 2019 World Allround Speed Skating Championships, finishing 21st overall. She participated at the European Speed Skating Championships for Women in 2019. She also competed at other international competitions, including at ISU Speed Skating World Cups.

Wiklund won the 1500m event at the 2021 World Single Distances Speed Skating Championships, held in Heerenveen, achieving a personal record of 1.54,61. She won ahead of Brittany Bowe from the United States and Evgeniia Lalenkova, competing for the Russian Skating Union.

Wiklund is also an active orienteer. Wiklund achieved a bronze medal in the Junior World Orienteering Championships in the 2018 relay, running for Norway. In 2021, she ran for the senior Norwegian team for the first time at a world cup event in Dalarna, Sweden.

Records

Personal records

Wiklund occupies the 9th position on the Adelskalender with a score of 156.946 points

Tournament overview

References

External links
 
 
 

2000 births
Sportspeople from Oslo
Norwegian female speed skaters
Living people
World Single Distances Speed Skating Championships medalists
Speed skaters at the 2022 Winter Olympics
Olympic speed skaters of Norway
Junior World Orienteering Championships medalists
21st-century Norwegian women